The Arlington Springs man is a set of Late Pleistocene human remains discovered in 1959 on Santa Rosa Island, one of the Channel Islands located off the coast of Southern California. The Arlington Springs archeological site is protected within northern Channel Islands National Park, and in Santa Barbara County.

History

Archaeology
In 1959–1960, two femora were excavated by Phil C. Orr, curator of anthropology and paleontology at the Santa Barbara Museum of Natural History, at Arlington Springs on Santa Rosa Island. Orr believed the remains were those of a 10,000-year-old man and dubbed them the "Arlington Springs Man".

The Arlington Springs Man was later re-examined in 1989 by Orr's successors at the museum, Dr. John R. Johnson and Don Morris. The two came to the initial assessment that the Arlington Springs Man was actually the "Arlington Springs Woman". Radiocarbon dating determined that the remains dated to 13,000 years BP, making the remains potentially the oldest-known human skeleton in North America. The term "Arlington Springs Woman" was used at that time to refer to these remains.

After further study, Johnson reversed his sex assessment in 2006, concluding that the remains were more likely those of a man, and the name "Arlington Springs Man" was again the more appropriate name.

Geology
The Paleoindian Arlington Springs Man lived on the former Pleistocene epoch Santa Rosae island. During the last ice age, the four northern Channel Islands were held together as the one mega-island of Santa Rosae.

The weather was much cooler and the sea level was  lower than today. His presence on an island at such an early date demonstrates that the earliest Paleoindians had watercraft capable of crossing the Santa Barbara Channel, and lends credence as well to a "coastal migration" theory for the peopling of the Americas, using boats to travel south from Siberia and Alaska.

See also
Archaeology of the Americas

Buhl Woman – 
Calico Early Man Site – 
Cueva de las Manos  – 
Fort Rock Cave – 
Kennewick Man – 
Kwäday Dän Ts'ìnchi – 
List of unsolved deaths
Marmes Rockshelter – 
Naia (skeleton) – 
Paisley Caves  – 
Peñon woman –

References

External links
NPS.gov: Channel Islands National Park — Arlington Man
About.com: Arlington Springs Site
Journal from The Center for the Study of the First Americans: "The Mammoth Trumpet" — Volume 21, Number 4 September 2006.

1959 archaeological discoveries
1959 in California
Archaeological sites in California
Channel Islands National Park
History of Santa Barbara County, California
Indigenous peoples of California
Late Pleistocene
Native American history of California
Natural history of the Channel Islands of California
Oldest human remains in the Americas
Paleo-Indian period
Pleistocene California
Pre-statehood history of California
Unsolved deaths